Miomote Dam  is a dam in Murakami, Niigata, Japan, completed in 1953.

References 

Dams in Niigata Prefecture
Dams completed in 1953